Elizabeth Cairns (born October 23, 1992) is an American rugby union player. She made her international debut for the United States in June 2015 against England.

Cairns was named in the Eagles squad for the 2019 Women’s Rugby Super Series.

Cairns came off the bench and scored a try in their Autumn International against Ireland in 2021. She later featured in their 89–0 trouncing by England.

Cairns was named in the Eagles squad for the 2022 Pacific Four Series in New Zealand. She started against the Wallaroos in their 16–14 win in Auckland. She was named in the starting line-up against the Black Ferns in Whangārei. She was selected in the Eagles squad for the 2021 Rugby World Cup in New Zealand.

References 

Living people
1992 births
Female rugby union players
American female rugby union players
United States women's international rugby union players